The 1915–16 Trinity Blue and White's basketball team represented Trinity College (later renamed Duke University) during the 1915–16 men's college basketball season. The head coach was Bob Doak, coaching his first season with Trinity. The team finished with an overall record of 9–11.

Schedule

|-

References

Duke Blue Devils men's basketball seasons
Duke
1915 in sports in North Carolina
1916 in sports in North Carolina